Hohmann is a surname. Notable people with the surname include:

 Arthur C. Hohmann (1895–1985), served as Los Angeles Police Department Chief of Police
 Christian Heinrich Hohmann (1811–1861), German composer, music teacher
 Karl Hohmann (1908–1974), German footballer
 Martin Hohmann (born 1948), German lawyer and politician
 Peter Hohmann, Edler of Hohenthal (1663–1732), German merchant
 Ruth Hohmann (born 1931), German jazz singer
 Thorsten Hohmann (born 1979), German professional pool player
 Ulf Hohmann (born 1963), German ethologist
 Walter Hohmann (1880–1945), German engineer

See also 
 Christine Hohmann-Dennhardt (born 1950), German politician and senior judge
 Hohman
 Homann
 Homan (disambiguation)

German-language surnames